The Sita Mata Wildlife Sanctuary is a wildlife sanctuary situated in Pratapgarh and Chittaurgarh districts of Rajasthan Rajasthan, India, declared as a protected forest area by the Government of Rajasthan Notification No. F 11 (9) Revenue/8/79, dated 2/11/1979. It is a dense forest, with an area of 422.95 square kilometers, which is about 40% of the total land area of the district. The land is undulating because of the confluence of three different formations — Malwa Plateau, the Vindhyachal Hills and Aravali mountain ranges.

Location
The sanctuary is located between 74 degrees 25' E and 24 degrees 04' N in Pratapgarh and Chittaurgarh districts of Rajasthan. The average elevation ranges between 280 and 600 metres above mean sea level with an average rainfall of 756 mm annually. The temperature variation during winter is between 6 and 14 degrees Celsius and in summer is between 32 and 45 degrees.

The thickly wooded Sita Mata Wildlife Sanctuary sprawls over the Aravali ranges and the Malwa plateau, with the seasonal rivers Jakham, Karmoi, Sitamata, Budhho, and Tankiya flowing through the forest. Jakham is the largest. It is located about 45 km from Pratapgarh and 108 km from the divisional headquarters. Udaipur, the sanctuary, covering 423 km2 of mainly dry deciduous vegetation has exceptionally rich flora and fauna.
The Champion and Seth forest type of Sita Mata is "IInd Dry Tropical Forest".

Pratapgarh is well connected with major cities in Rajasthan, Gujarat & Madhya Pradesh by road. Daily bus services connect pratapgarh with Chittorgarh (110 km), Banswara (85 km), Udaipur (165 km), Dungarpur (195 km), Rajsamand (133 km), Jodhpur (435 km), Jaipur (432 km) in Rajasthan; Ratlam (85 km), Mandsaur (32 km) in M.P. and Delhi (705 km). Pratapgarh is yet to be connected with a railway line. The nearest railway stations are Mandsaur (M.P.) (28 km) & Chittorgarh (110 km). Dabok Airport (Udaipur) is 145 km.

Flora
It is the only forest region where more than half of the trees are high building value teak. These include salar, tendu (Diospyros melonoxy Roxb.), bad, peepal, babool, neem, arinja (Acacia leucophaea), siras, churail, kachnar, gulmohar, amaltas, bakayan, ashok, mahua, semal, goondi, khejadi (Prosopis spicigera), kumta (Acacia rupestris), amla, bamboo, sindoor, chironjee, rudraksha and bel trees. A survey has been taken to document ethnobotanical information on plants used by the natives to construct their huts and hamlets. At least 31 different species are used to construct of various types of huts and hamlets in the sanctuary. Of the 108 varieties of high value medicinal herbs found here, 17 are endangered.

Fauna

Birds
A large number of residential and migratory birds are found in this region, nearly 130 varieties. Little grebe, little cormorant, Indian darter (snake bird), gray heron, pond heron, cattle egret, little egret, painted stork, white-necked stork, spoonbill, lesser whistling thrush, ruddy shelduck, pintail, cotton teal, Indian spot-billed duck, nukta, parah kite, shikra, white-eyed buzzard, king vulture, white-backed vulture, tawny eagle, white scavenger vulture, eastrel, black partridge, rain quail, jungle bush quail, Indian peafowl, sarus crane, white-breasted waterhen, moorhen, purple moorhen, common coot, pheasant-tailed jacana, red-wattled lapwing, red shank, wood sandpiper, common sandpiper, little stint, black-winged stilt, stone-curlew, Indian courser, river tern, common sandgrouse, green pigeon, blue rock pigeon, red collared dove, Indian ring dove, spotted dove, little brown dove, Alexandrine parakeet, rose-ringed parakeet, blossom-headed parakeet, common hawk-cuckoo, pied crested cuckoo, koel, crow pheasant, spotted owlet, collared scops owl, Franklis nightjar, house swift, palm swift, pied kingfisher, common kingfisher, white breasted kingfisher, Asian green bee-eater, blue tailed eater, blue-cheeked bee-eater, Indian roller, European roller, hoopoe, gray hornbill, coppersmith, golden backed woodpecker, yellow fronted pied woodpecker, Indian pitta, red winged bush lark, ashy crowned finchlark, rufous tailed finchlark, crested lark, dusky crag martin, wire-tailed swallow, red-rumped swallow, gray shrike, bay-backed shrike, rufous backed shrike, golden oriole, black drongo (king crow), white-bellied drongo, brahminy myna, rody paster, common myna, bank myna, Indian tree pie,  house crow, jungle crow, black-headed cuckooshrike, scarlet minivet, common iora, red-vented bulbul, common babbler, yellow-eyed babbler, large grey babbler, gray headed flycatcher, red-breasted flycatcher, white browed fantail flycatcher, paradise flycatcher, Franklin's ween warbler, tailorbird, lesser whitethroat, Indian robin, crested bunting, magpie robin, brown rock chat, collared bush chat, pied bush chat, large cuckooshrike, wood shrike, grey tit, yellow-cheeked tit, yellow headed wagtail, grey wagtail, white wagtail, purple sunbird, white-eye, house sparrow, weaver bird, red avadavat, white-throated munia, scaly-breasted munia, are a few varieties that are common to this forest region.

Two new bird species, white-throated ground thrush  and black-necked monarch were discovered in the sanctuary.

Mammals
The flying squirrel (Petaurista philippensis) can be seen gliding from one tree to another around sunset in the Arampura forest, 17 km away from Dhariawad . Its feeding activities are nocturnal and therefore it hides during the day time in its hollow in a Mahua tree. The best time to watch flying squirrels is between February and March, when most of the Mahua trees shed their leaves and it is easier to spot the squirrel gliding between branches of leafless trees.

There are a variety of deer at the sanctuary, including the Chousingha (four-horned antelope) and spotted deer. Caracal, wild boar, pangolin, Indian leopard, striped hyena, golden jackal, Bengal fox, jungle cat, porcupine, sloth bear, and nilgai are also present.

Asiatic Lion Reintroduction Project

The Asiatic lion, which used to occur in Rajasthan, is now confined to Gujarat. Sita Mata Sanctuary had been considered as a place to relocate some lions, but the availability of prey was deemed to be negligible. Also, the area was prone to human disturbance.

Tourist attractions

It houses ancient Valmiki Ashram (the birthplace of Luv and Kush, the twins born to Sita and Lord Rama), the Hanuman and Sitamata temples, and other places of historical and mythological importance. Another place of interest in the sanctuary, 5 km from Tikhi Magri, is Lakhiya Bhata, where drawings of prehistoric animals are engraved on rocks. There is a fair held in the sanctuary at the Sita Mata temple every July.

Further reading
 Collins' Handguide to the birds of Indian sub-continent, Martin W. Woodcock, William Collins Sons & Co., London, 1980
 The book of Indian Birds, Salim Ali, 1972
 The birds of India, T.C. Jerdon, 3 vols.1862-64
 A synopsis of the Birds of India and Pakistan, S.Dillon Ripley, 1961
 A Study of Avifauna of the Rajasthan State (India), Dr. Dhirendra Devarshi, 2004
 Meena, K. L. & Yadav, B. L. 2008. Floral resources of Rajasthan with special reference to Sitamata wildlife sanctuary.
 Geographical aspects. Proceedings of the 35th National conference of Rajasthan geography Association. MLV Government College, Bhilwara. Vol. IX, pp. 6–65.
 Meena, K. L. 2014. Flora of Wildlife Sanctuary. Discovery Publishing House Pvt. Ltd. New Delhi.

See also
 Arid Forest Research Institute (AFRI)
 Khathiar-Gir dry deciduous forests

References

Khathiar-Gir dry deciduous forests
Protected areas established in 1979
Tourist attractions in Pratapgarh district, Rajasthan
Wildlife sanctuaries in Rajasthan
1979 establishments in Rajasthan